Barret, Barrett, or Barretts may refer to:

People
 Barrett (name), including a list of people with the surname
 Barrett Brown (born 1981), American journalist and activist)
 Barrett Foa, American actor

Court cases 
 Barrett v. Rosenthal, a 2006 California Supreme Court case concerning online defamation
 Barrett v. United States, an 1898 Supreme Court case regarding subdivision of South Carolina into judicial districts

Fictional characters
Brenda Barrett, a character on the daytime soap opera General Hospital
Dana Barrett, a character in the films Ghostbusters and Ghostbusters II, played by Sigourney Weaver
Elcid Barrett, captain of the Antelope in the folk song "Barrett's Privateers"
Betty Barrett, a character on the TV show Atomic Betty
Oliver Barrett, a character in the book Love Story and its film and musical adaptations
Barret Wallace, a character in the video game Final Fantasy VII

Organizations
Barrett, The Honors College, Arizona State University
Barrett Firearms Manufacturing, a weapons manufacturing company
Barrett Technology, a robotics company
Barrett-Jackson, a car auction company
Bill Barrett Corporation, an energy company
Col. James Barrett Farm, a historic site in Concord, Massachusetts
Barrett (advertising agency), an advertising agency

Places & geographic features

United States
Barrett, Indiana
Barrett, Minnesota
Barrett Mountain, New Hampshire
Barrett Township, Monroe County, Pennsylvania
Barrett Township, Perkins County, South Dakota
Barrett, Texas
Barrett, West Virginia
Barrett, U.S. Virgin Islands

Barrett Dam, reservoir, San Diego, California

France
 Barret, Charente
 Barret-de-Lioure, Drôme
 Barret-sur-Méouge, Hautes-Alpes
 Breuil-Barret, Vendée
 Pont-de-Barret, Drôme

Ireland
 Barretts (barony), County Cork

Weaponry
.416 Barrett
Barrett M82
Barrett M90
Barrett M95
Barrett M98B
Barrett M99
Barrett REC7
Barrett XM109
Barrett XM500

Other
 Barrett (album), the second album by Syd Barrett
 Barrett's esophagus, a medical condition
 Barrett reduction, an algorithm in modular arithmetic

See also
 Barratt (disambiguation)
 Barrette (disambiguation)
 Barret Browning